Palfrey was a light riding horse common in the Middle Ages.

Palfrey may also refer to:
Palfrey (surname), people with the surname Palfrey
Palfrey, West Midlands, a locality in the town of Walsall
Palfrey Island, part of the Lizard Island Group 270 km north of Cairns, Queensland, Australia

See also
Mr. Palfrey of Westminster, 1980s British television series